Luc Chikhani is a French oral and maxillofacial surgeon best known for reconstructing the face of Trevor Rees-Jones, the former bodyguard of Dodi Fayed, after the car crash that killed Diana, Princess of Wales, Dodi Fayed, and their driver, Henri Paul. He was interviewed in Rees-Jones's book The Bodyguard's Story.

He is currently Consultant Maxillofacial Surgeon, Department of Maxillofacial Surgery, Teaching Pitié-Salpêtrière Hospital, Paris, France.

He has performed research on sialorrhea (excessive salivation),
and has written about cosmetic use of botulinum toxin.

He was interviewed in April 2014 by Paris Match, about cosmetic surgery to improve one's smile.

Books

References

Living people
French surgeons
Year of birth missing (living people)